Gov may refer to:
 Government
 Governor
 .gov, a top level domain
 Gidi Gov (born 1950), Israeli singer
 Gove Airport, IATA airport code "GOV"
 Goo language, ISO 639 code